Sophie Mae Pierre (née Eustace) , is a Canadian First Nations chief and administrator.  She served as the Commissioner for the British Columbia Treaty Commission from 2009 to 2015.

Early life 
Born in Cranbrook, British Columbia in 1951, she grew up on the St. Mary's Indian Reserve near the city.  Pierre attended elementary school at the Kootenay Indian Residential School, located in the St. Eugene Mission, which was part of the Canadian residential school system. She attended public high school in Cranbrook, but dropped out at age 17 to get married. After separating from her husband five years later, Pierre finished her high-school diploma and moved to Victoria with her two children.   There she studied business administration at Camosun College, after which she returned to St. Mary's to work in the band administration.

Career 
In the 1970s, Pierre was involved in the formation of the Ktunaxa Kinbasket Tribal Council.  She served her first term on the St. Mary's Band council in 1979, and would go to serve for 30 years, 25 as chief of the band.  She served on the board of the College of the Rockies from 1990 to 1993, and was named to the Order Of British Columbia in 1994.  Pierre was appointed as Chief Commissioner of BC Treaty Commission in 2009, which examines First Nations land claim issues in the province. On June 30, 2016, Pierre was named an Officer of the Order of Canada for "her role in the British Columbia treaty process and for her commitment to the economic development of First Nations."

References 

1951 births
Living people
First Nations women
Indigenous leaders in British Columbia
Members of the Order of British Columbia
Officers of the Order of Canada
People from Cranbrook, British Columbia
Indspire Awards
Camosun College alumni